Clarksburg (formerly, Clarksburgh) is a census-designated place in Yolo County, California. It is located on the Sacramento River, in the extreme southeastern corner of the county.   It lies at an elevation of 10 feet (3 m) in ZIP code 95612 and area codes 916 and 279.

Geography
According to the United States Census Bureau, the CDP covers an area of 2.0 square miles (5.3 km2), all of it land.

Climate
According to the Köppen Climate Classification system, Clarksburg has a warm-summer Mediterranean climate, abbreviated "Csa" on climate maps.

Demographics

The 2010 United States Census reported that Clarksburg had a population of 418. The racial makeup of Clarksburg was 339 (81.1%) White, 2 (0.5%) African American, 2 (0.5%) Native American, 16 (3.8%) Asian, 1 (0.2%) Pacific Islander, 37 (8.9%) from other races, and 21 (5.0%) from two or more races. Hispanic or Latino of any race were 109 persons (26.1%).

The Census reported that 418 people (100% of the population) lived in households, 0 (0%) lived in non-institutionalized group quarters, and 0 (0%) were institutionalized.

There were 168 households, out of which 51 (30.4%) had children under the age of 18 living in them, 102 (60.7%) were opposite-sex married couples living together, 11 (6.5%) had a female householder with no husband present, 10 (6.0%) had a male householder with no wife present.  There were 4 (2.4%) unmarried opposite-sex partnerships, and 1 (0.6%) same-sex married couples or partnerships. 40 households (23.8%) were made up of individuals, and 14 (8.3%) had someone living alone who was 65 years of age or older. The average household size was 2.49.  There were 123 families (73.2% of all households); the average family size was 2.96.

The population was spread out, with 96 people (23.0%) under the age of 18, 27 people (6.5%) aged 18 to 24, 63 people (15.1%) aged 25 to 44, 140 people (33.5%) aged 45 to 64, and 92 people (22.0%) who were 65 years of age or older.  The median age was 48.7 years. For every 100 females, there were 98.1 males.  For every 100 females age 18 and over, there were 89.4 males.

The homeowner vacancy rate was 0%; the rental vacancy rate was 10.0%.  270 people (64.6% of the population) lived in owner-occupied housing units and 148 people (35.4%) lived in rental housing units.

History
Clarksburg has been settled in stages dating back as early as the 1850s when Merritt Island was first cleared and developed for agricultural uses. Postal authorities first established a post office in 1876, under the name "Clarksburgh" and changed the name to "Clarksburg" in 1893. The town was named after Robert C. Clark who settled at the place in 1849. In the 1920s the New Holland Land Company began subdividing the tracts in the area and formally established Clarksburg as an unincorporated community. Clarksburg is unique among small California towns in that many of the families who initially settled the area are still present, thus lending a small-town charm to the community.

Present day

The community is mostly centered on the two churches in town, the Holland Market, the volunteer fire department, the three schools, and the public library. The 1930s era Old Sugar Mill (which closed in 1988) is now the center of development with 125 new homes proposed for construction on the property. This will be the first significant development since the Old Sugar Mill was built in the 1930s. The project is currently stayed by the Delta Protection Commission until it is made compliant with their Resource and Management Plan. Appeals were made to this State of California commission by the Natural Resources Defense Council and the Concerned Citizens of Clarksburg. As of February 2008 the Old Sugar Mill development was involved in significant litigation. A portion of the original Old Sugar Mill is now home to a modern wine tasting and production facility.

The Bogle Winery on Merritt Island has become the most famous of the Clarksburg appellation vintners with their wines being sold worldwide and being served at the White House as of 2007.

The population in 2008 is approximately 300. This is an approximation as the community borders are undefined and opinions on what outlying areas are actually part of Clarksburg vary from one source to the next. The portion of Sacramento County directly across the Sacramento River was once considered part of the community due to the ferry crossing that existed at Clarksburg from 1920 until the Freeport Bridge opened on New Year's Day in 1930. The ferry itself sank in November, 1928. Some of the older members of the community still refer to that adjoining area of Sacramento County as Clarksburg for that reason.

There are three schools in Clarksburg: Delta Elementary Charter School, Clarksburg Middle School, and Delta High School. All three schools are a part of the River Delta Unified School District.

Architectural heritage
Architect William Raymond Yelland would spend summers in Clarksburg with family. W.R. Yelland designed several buildings in the town of Clarksburg including several homes, the Clarksburg Community Church, and the Sugar Mill. W.R. Yelland is most noted for his Arts and Crafts and Storybook Houses of the 1920s and 1930s.

Industry and agriculture

What few industries that exist in the area are mostly involved in supporting the agricultural concerns of the area. Agriculture in the area principally includes wine grapes, dichondra grass seed, and tomatoes. Alfalfa is also found to occur but it is not the principal crop as it was prior to the 1920s.

Events and culture

The Paul Reese Memorial Clarksburg Country Run occurs every November as it has since 1965 and includes a  race, a half-marathon, a 5k fun run, and children's events.

The Friends of the Clarksburg Library sponsor The Wines of Clarksburg fundraiser every year to support the local library. The event is typically hosted at the New Holland Land Company's former site and the event is a good excuse to view this example of historic, California Delta architecture.

Notable people
 Charles Carroll "Tony" Eason, IV (born October 8, 1959, in Blythe, California, raised in Walnut Grove, California) is a former American football quarterback who attended Delta High School in Clarksburg before playing in the National Football League for the New England Patriots and New York Jets. Eason retired after the 1990 NFL season and currently resides in California.

References

External links

Census-designated places in Yolo County, California
Census-designated places in California
Populated places on the Sacramento River